Live at the Lizard Lounge! is the first live recording by Lake Street Dive. It was released through their website on August 22, 2011.

Reception
Writing for PopMatters, Zachary Houle said, "Well, Live at the Lizard Lounge, which was recorded earlier this year at a hometown show, has an amazing soundtrack but a rather underwhelming video to accompany it. So you'd be both in the right and the wrong to pick this one up. But we should focus on the positives first. The soundtrack largely culls material from Lake Street Dive, with three choice, intriguing covers thrown into the mix: the old soul and R&B standard "This Magic Moment" (first recorded by the Drifters in 1960, but then covered by unlikely acts such as Lou Reed and the Misfits), George Michael's "Faith" and Hall and Oates' "Rich Girl". While the band's recorded output leans into folk, soul and jazz territory, Live at the Lizard Lounge is a much more rocking affair, largely focusing on the guitar and trumpet finesse of Mike Olson."

Track listing
Video tracks are from liner notes  Audio only tracks are offered on iTunes.

Personnel
Rachael Price – lead vocals
Mike “McDuck” Olson – guitar, trumpet, vocals
Bridget Kearney – bass guitar, vocals
Mike Calabrese – drums, percussion and vocals

References

2011 albums
Lake Street Dive albums